Greatest Hits 1986–2004 is a compilation album by pop singer Amy Grant, released in 2004. It was the first compilation of Grant's music to be released since The Collection in 1986. It includes two previously unreleased songs: "The Water" and "Come Be With Me" and pressings of the CD on A&M Records contain a bonus CD of remixes and radio edits as mentioned below.

Track listing

 The A&M Records release of this album included a second disc containing remixes of four tracks from the first disc.
 "Every Heartbeat (7" Body And Soul Mix)" (Grant, Kirkpatrick, Peacock) – 3:20
 "That's What Love Is For (7" Single Mix)" (Grant, Muller, Omartian) – 4:20
 "I Will Remember You (Rhythm Remix)" (Chapman, Grant, Thomas) – 5:05
 "House of Love (Classic Philly Soul Mix)" (Barnhill, Greenberg, Wilson) – 4:35

Production
 Mike Ragogna – compilation producer
 Andy McKaie – compilation producer
 Dan Marnien – engineer
 Susan Browne – design

Charts

References

2004 greatest hits albums
Amy Grant compilation albums
A&M Records compilation albums
Word Records albums